Dọlápọ̀ Is Fine is a live action short film directed by Ethosheia Hylton and written by Joan Iyiola and Chibundu Onuzo in 2020.

In 2020, it won the HBO Short Film Competition at American Black Film Festival.

This short film was co-produced by Joan Iyiola, Joe Bell and Chibundu Onuzo, and executive produced by Amy Dowd and Elisabeth Hopper. Dọlápọ̀ Is Fine is distributed worldwide by the International Production & Distribution company Salaud Morisset.

Plot 
Ready to leave her UK boarding school and enter the working world, a young Black woman faces pressure to change her name and natural hairstyle.

Awards 
Since its launch, the film has been selected in many festivals around the world.

Cast & Crew 
Cast

 Dọlápọ̀: Doyin Ajiboye
 Imogen: Katie Friedli Walton
 Daisy: Joan Iyiola
 Michelle Adams: Gina McKee
 Mum: Pamela Nomvete
 Dad: Joseph Mydell
 Mr. Wilson: Luke Gasper
 Sunita: Thamilvani Umaipalan

Crew

 Director: Ethosheia Hylton
 Writer: Joan Iyiola & Chibundu Onuzo
 Producer: Millie Marsh
 Production Company: Apatan Productions
 Co-Producer: Joe Bell, Joan Iyiola, Chibundu Onuzo
 Executive Producers: Amy Dowd, Elisabeth Hopper
 Line Producer: Nicholas Jessup
 Production Manager: Isobel Pietsch
 Cinematographer: Yinka Edward
 Editor: Xanna Ward-Dixon
 Sound Design: Richard Chesebrough
 Composer: Chibundu Onuzo
 Production Sound Mixer: Alex Langner
 Production Design: Elaine Xu
 Casting Director: Savannah Power

References

External links
 
 Dọlápọ̀ Is Fine (Full Film) on Vimeo

2020 films
2020 short films
American short films
2020s English-language films